A blue colour works is a paintworks where blue pigment for use in glassmaking is produced. Usually the pigment, cobalt blue, needed for this purpose, was manufactured from cobalt-containing ore as in the case of the factories listed below.

Blue colour works 

 Saxony
 Oberschlema Blue Colour Works (Blaufarbenwerk Oberschlema) (founded 1644) in Oberschlema, according to some sources this was the largest blue colour works in the world
 Schneeberg Blue Colour Works (Blaufarbenwerk Schneeberg) (1568 to around 1580) in Schneeberg, the first small blue colour works in Saxony
 Unterjugel Blue Colour Works (Blaufarbenwerk Unterjugel), 17th century, in Unterjugel
 Niederpfannenstiel Blue Colour Works (Blaufarbenwerk Niederpfannenstiel) (founded 1635) in Niederpfannenstiel
 Schindler's Blue Colour Works (Schindlersches Blaufarbenwerk) (founded 1649) in Schindlerswerk
 Oehmesches Blue Colour Works (1649–1688) (Oehmesches Blaufarbenwerk) in Annaberg
 Zschopenthal Blue Colour Works (Zschopenthal Blaufarbenwerk) (1687–1847) in Zschopenthal
 Prussia
 Hasserode Blue Colour Works (Blaufarbenwerk Hasserode) (to around 1850)
 Bohemia
 Christophhammer Blue Colour Works (Blaufarbenwerk Christophhammer) (1750–1874) in Christophhammer
 Norway
 Modum Blue Colour Works in Modum
 Snarum Blue Colour Works in Snarum

Literature 
 Wilhelm Bruchmüller: Der Kobaltbergbau und die Blaufarbenwerke in Sachsen bis zum Jahre 1653. Crossen, 1897 (digitalised)
 Friedrich Kapf: Beyträge zur Geschichte des Kobolts, Koboltbergbaues und der Blaufarbenwerke. Breslau, 1792 (digitalised)

Chemical industry
Mining in the Ore Mountains
Mining in the Harz